John Collin (18 October 1928 – 25 February 1987) was a British actor frequently seen on UK television during the 1960s and 1970s, mainly in supporting roles such as ITC's The Saint (S5/E21). Collin's best-known role was as Detective Sergeant Haggar in the long running BBC police series Z-Cars. Another notable role was as Guardian officer Tom Weston in the 1971 ITV political fantasy The Guardians.

He also played Mr. Alderson, the father-in-law of James Herriot, in both the television movie All Creatures Great and Small and the subsequent television series.

Filmography

References

External links
 

1928 births
1987 deaths
English male television actors
20th-century English male actors